The 1971–72 FIBA European Cup Winners' Cup was the sixth edition of FIBA's 2nd-tier level European-wide professional club basketball competition, contested between national domestic cup champions, running from 4 November 1971, to 21 March 1972. It was contested by 21 teams, five less than in the previous edition, and it marked a reform in the competition's format; a 6-team group stage was introduced, replacing the quarterfinals.

Defending champion, Simmenthal Milano, defeated Crvena zvezda in the final, which returned to a single game format, to win its second trophy, becoming the first team to successfully defend its title. It was the third title in a row for an Italian League team. This season's FIBA European Champions Cup final, also featured Italian and Yugoslav League teams, with the same outcome.

Participants

First round

|}

*Partizani Tirana (for political reasons), Ghouta and Blue Stars Amsterdam all withdrew before the first leg, and their rivals received a forfeit (2-0) in both games.

Second round

|}

Automatically qualified to the quarter finals group stage
 Simmenthal Milano (title holder)

Quarterfinals
The quarter finals were played with a round-robin system, in which every Two Game series (TGS) constituted as one game for the record.

Semifinals

|}

Final
March 21, Alexandreio Melathron, Thessaloniki

|}

References

External links 
FIBA European Cup Winner's Cup 1971–72 linguasport.com
FIBA European Cup Winner's Cup 1971–72

Cup
FIBA Saporta Cup